The Journey to Kafiristan (German: Die Reise nach Kafiristan) is a 2001 drama film written and directed by Donatello and Fosco Dubini.

Synopsis 
The film follows Swiss author Annemarie Schwarzenbach's journey through Kafiristan, a region in Afghanistan, with ethnologist Ella Maillart, who is investigation nomadic people there, as they explore themselves and their developing feelings toward each other.

Cast 
 Jeanette Hain as Annemarie Schwarzenbach
 Nina Petri as Ella Maillart
 Monika Arnó as Dame auf dem Schiff
 Vassilios Avgouteas as Barkeeper
 Matthew Burton as Joseph Hackin
 Christoph Frass as Diener

References 

2000s German-language films
2001 biographical drama films
2000s adventure films
Dutch adventure films
German adventure films
Swiss adventure films
Films set in 1939
Films set in Afghanistan
2000s female buddy films
Films based on non-fiction books
2000s German films